Hipponix benthophila is a species of small limpet-like sea snail, a marine gastropod mollusc in the family Hipponicidae, the hoof snails.

Distribution

Description 
The maximum recorded shell length is 8 mm.

Habitat 
Minimum recorded depth is 91 m. Maximum recorded depth is 682 m.

References

External links

Hipponicidae
Gastropods described in 1889